Mikko Kyösti Heiniö (born 18 May 1948) is a Finnish composer and musicologist.

Life
Mikko Heiniö was born in 1948 in Tampere, and studied composition with Joonas Kokkonen and piano with Liisa Pohjola at the Sibelius Academy in Helsinki from 1971 to 1975, and then studied composition with Witold Szalonek in West Berlin from 1975 to 1977 while at the same time beginning studies in musicology at the University of Helsinki. He earned a diploma in composition from the Sibelius Academy in 1977, and a doctorate in musicology in 1984 from the University of Helsinki, where he lectured between 1977 and 1985 (Murtomäki 2001). He was appointed professor of musicology at the University of Turku in 1986–2005 and he is composer-in-residence of the Turku Philharmonic Orchestra since 1997. Heiniö has been a member of the Board of Teosto (the Finnish Composers’ Copyright Bureau) and he has served as Chairman of the Society of Finnish Composers in 1992–2010.

Heiniö's compositions include nine piano concertos, three symphonies and numerous chamber works for various instrument combinations. He has written four operas: the church opera Riddaren och draken (The Knight and the Dragon, 2000), Käärmeen hetki (The Hour of the Serpent), premièred in September 2006, and Eerik XIV (Erik XIV), premièred in November 2011, and Johanna (2018). His work list also includes solo works as well as vocal and choral music.

Heiniö is also a noted writer on music, specialising in the subject of new Finnish music. He has written twelve books and over two hundred articles. His music has been recorded on the BIS, Finlandia and Sony labels, among others.

Work list

Operas
Riddaren och draken (2000)
Käärmeen hetki (2006)
Eerik XIV (2008–2010)
Johanna (2016–2018)

Orchestral Works
Framtidens skugga (The Shadow of the Future) (1980) for soprano and 4tpt/4tbn/tba
Concerto for piano and orchestra no 3, op 39 (1981)
Vuelo de alambre, op 43 (1983) for soprano and orchestra
Genom kvällen (Through the evening), op 48 (1986), Concerto for piano and orchestra no 4, for solo piano, mixed choir and string orchestra
Possible Worlds – a Symphony, op 49 (1987/99)
Concerto for Piano and Orchestra no 5, op 53 (1989)
Wind Pictures (Tuulenkuvia), op 56 (1991) for mixed choir and orchestra
Dall'ombra all'ombra, op 58 (1992), seven variations, theme and coda for orchestra and synthesizer
Hermes (Piano concerto no 6) for piano, soprano and string orchestra, op 61 (1994) (Dance Pictures)
Trias, op 62 (1995) de "O quam mundum" (Piae Cantiones 1582: lxxi)
Minne, op 64 (1996) for string orchestra
Symphony no 2 "Yön ja rakkauden lauluja" ("Songs of Night and Love"), op 66 (1997)
On the Rocks, op 68 (1998)
Khora (Piano concerto no 7) (2001) (Dance images for piano and five percussionists)
Envelope (2002) for Haydn's trumpet concerto in eb (for solo trumpet and orchestra)
Sonata da chiesa (2005) for 4hn, 3trp, 3trb, tba, cel, timp, 3perc
Alla madre (2007), for solo violin and orchestra
Moon Concerto (Kuukonsertto, 2008) (Piano concerto no 8) for piano, mezzo-soprano and orchestra
Maestoso, Variations of a Fragment by Eric XIV (2008) for orchestra
Syyskesän laulu (Late Summer Song) (2008) for voice and orchestra
Nonno (Piano concerto no 9) (2011) for amplified piano and big band
Concerto for Organ and Orchestra (2013)
Syvyyden yllä tuuli (Wind above the Depths) (2019) for barytone, mixed choir and orchestra

Chamber Music
Duo per violino e pianoforte (1979)
Brass mass (1979) for 4tpt/4tbn/tba(ad lib)
Piano trio (1988)
In g for cello and piano (1988)
Piano quintet (1993)
Relay for violin and cello (1998)
Sextet (2000) for baritone and ensemble: fl, cl, vl, vc, pf
Treno della notte, for clarinet, cello and piano (2000)
Café au lait, for flute, clarinet, violin, cello and piano (2006)
Canzona per trio d'archi (2006)
Piano Quartet (The voice of the tree/Puun ääni) (2006)
Duo per violino e pianoforte (1979)
Brass mass (1979) for 4tpt/4tbn/tba(ad lib)
Piano trio (1988)
In G for cello and piano (1988)
Piano quintet (1993)
Relay for violin and cello (1998)
Sextet (2000) for baritone and ensemble: fl, cl, vl, vc, pf
Treno della notte, for clarinet, cello and piano (2000)
Café au lait, for flute, clarinet, violin, cello and piano (2006)
Canzona per trio d'archi (2006)
Piano Quartet (The voice of the tree/Puun ääni) (2006)
Mot natten (Towards Night) (2018) for cello and guitar

Choral Works
Kolme kansanlaulua (Drei Finnische Volkslieder), for double mixed choir (1977)
Landet som icke är, for children's or women's choir and piano (1980)
Luceat, for mixed choir (1992)
Non-Stop, for mixed choir (1995)
Juhlamarssi hiljaisille miehille, for male choir (1996)
Pikavuaro Turkku, for mixed choir (2002)
Tomumieli, for male choir and two djembe drums (2003)
The Bishop's Spring Dream, for five male voices (5 or 15 singers) (2005)
Maria Suite, for mixed choir (2011)
Evening, for mixed choir (2015)
Amen, for male choir and tubular bell (2016)

References
 Karlson, Anu. 1996. "Musicology at the University of Turku and Mikko Heiniö's Divided Year". Finnish Music Quarterly, 1996 no. 1:33–36
 Kennedy, Michael. 2006. The Oxford Dictionary of Music, second edition, revised. Oxford and New York: Oxford University Press. .
 Korhonen, Kimmo. 1990. "Composer and Analyst of the Postmodern Age". Finnish Music Quarterly, 1990 no. 1:30–35.
 Murtomäki, Veijo. 2001. "Heiniö, Mikko (Kyösti)". The New Grove Dictionary of Music and Musicians, second edition, edited by Stanley Sadie and John Tyrrell. London: Macmillan Publishers.
 Starikova, Natal'â. 1998. "Koncert dlja orkestra Mikko Hejniö: K voprosu o postmodernizme v finskoj muzyke" [Concerto for Orchestra by Mikko Heiniö: The Question of Postmodernism in Finnish Music]. In О музыке композиторов Финляндии и скандинавских стран [The Music of Finnish and Other Scandinavian Composers], edited by Kiralina Iosifovna Ûžak, 79–93. Saint Petersburg: Gosudarstvennaâ Konservatoriâ imeni N.A. Rimskogo-Korsakova. .

External links
Mikko Heiniö page at Finnish Music Information Centre site
Mikko Heiniö page at Fennica Gehrman site
Mikko Heiniö at 375 humanists. Faculty of Arts, University of Helsinki. 26.6.2015.

1948 births
Living people
20th-century classical composers
21st-century classical composers
Finnish classical composers
Tieto-Finlandia Award winners
Finnish male classical composers
Academic staff of the University of Turku
Finnish opera composers
Male opera composers
20th-century male musicians
21st-century male musicians
20th-century Finnish composers
21st-century Finnish composers